Marko Perović (born 11 January 1984) is a former Serbian professional footballer who currently the assistant coach of Serbia national football team.

Club career

Red Star Belgrade
Perović came through the ranks of KF Prishtina before moving to Red Star Belgrade. He made an impact at Red Star, proving to be an energetic and skillful player. However, in May 2007 he fractured his tibia in the second-last game of the season against Mladost Apatin. Following his recovery he played only in a few games.

FC Basel
During the winter break of their 2007–08 season FC Basel reached an agreement with Red Star to loan the former captain of the Serbian U21 national team until the end of the season and in the contract was the option of a definitely signing. On 31 January 2008 Perović signed the loan contract. Perović played his domestic league debut for his new club in the home game in the St. Jakob-Park on 9 February, coming on as a substitute for Scott Chipperfield. He scored his first goal for the team in the same game as Basel won 3–0 over Neuchâtel Xamax. He had 15 appearences up until the end of the season, including one UEFA Cup and two Swiss Cup games, three times in the starting 11, the rest as substitute. At the end of the 2007–08 season he won the Double with the club. They won the League Championship title with four points advantage over second placed Young Boys. In the Swiss Cup Basel advanced to the final, winning this 4–1 against AC Bellinzona they won the competition.

Basel pulled the buy-out option and on 2 June it was announced that Perović had signed a permanent three-year contract with them.  To the beginning of the 2008–09 season he was member of the Basel team that won the Uhrencup. They beat Legia Warsaw 6–1 and played a 2–2 draw with Borussia Dortmund to end the table on top slot above Dortmund and Luzern. He scored on his full Basel league debut, in a 2–1 away win over BSC Young Boys on 18 July. He followed up the next week by scoring the winner in a 1–0 home win over Grasshopper Club Zürich and was also named as Man of the Match in that game. Basel joined the 2008–09 UEFA Champions League in the second qualifying round and with an aggregate score of 5–3 they eliminated IFK Göteborg. In the next round they played against Vitória de Guimarães. The first leg ended in a goalless draw, but with a 2–1 win in the second leg they eliminated Vitória and advanced to the group stage. Here Basel were matched with Barcelona, Sporting CP and Shakhtar Donetsk, but ended the group in last position winning just one point after a 1–1 draw in Camp Nou. Perović had six appearences during these ten matches.

At the end of the 2008–09 Super League season Basel were third in the table, seven points behind new champions Zürich and one adrift of runners-up Young Boys. Perović had 27 league appearences In the 2008–09 Swiss Cup Basel advanced via Schötz, Bulle, Thun and Zurich to the semi-finals. But here they were stopped by YB. After a goalless 90 minutes and extra time, YB decided the penalty shoot-out 3–2 and advanced to the final to become runners-up, as Sion became cup winners.

In their following season under new head coach Thorsten Fink Perović saw little first-team football and he was demoted to the U-21 reserve team. During the winter break of that season Perović left the club. During his two years with the club, Perović  played a total of 86 games for Basel scoring a total of 15 goals. 40 of these games were in the Swiss Super League, four in the Swiss Cup, nine in the UEFA competitions (Champions League UEFA Cup and Europa League) and 33 were friendly games. He scored ten goals in the domestic league, one in the cup and the other four were scored during the test games.

New England Revolution

2010 Season
The 2009–10 FC Basel season saw Perović play just 12 minutes of football under Thorsten Fink, and in January 2010, at the suggestion of his agent, Perovic agreed to trail with Major League Soccer side New England Revolution.

Perović noted that he'd never considered moving to MLS before his agent's suggestion. In an interview with the Revolution, he noted several challenges he faced when coming to the league, including the language barrier and travel. MLS travel included long plane flights, with which he had no familiarity, as his former teams traveled primarily by bus. He cited the outreach and support of his teammates as factors that helped him settle in.

After a successful trial, and a successful pre-season stint which included two friendlies, the New England Revolution elected to sign Perović. Basel committed to a free transfer.

After squaring away his P-1 visa and contract situation with Basel, Perović signed with New England on March 26, 2010, the same day the Revolution announced the return of winger Khano Smith. He made his MLS debut as a substitute in the second half of the Revolution's 4–1 victory over Toronto FC on April 10, 2010.

Deployed at left wing, Perović scored his first goal for the Revs, a "dazzling" 30-yard free kick, on April 24, 2010, against the eventual MLS Cup champion Colorado Rapids at Gillette Stadium in front of a crowd of 8,142. It was the Revolution's first set piece goal of the season.

Perović scored his second goal for the Revolution on May 29, 2010, in the 8th minute against the New York Red Bulls. Though the Revolution would go on to win the game 3-2, the game is most remembered for the broken fibula suffered by starting goalkeeper Preston Burpo in a collision with New York's Dane Richards.

Perović truly began to shine during the month of July. During a five-game stretch from July 10–31, he scored four of the Revolution’s six goals while assisting on another, scored by Zack Schilawski. These included a 67th minute game winner against the LA Galaxy on July 10, and an equalizer against the Philadelphia Union in the Revolution's first-ever trip to PPL Park on July 31. On the 17th and 20th of July, in SuperLiga Group B play, Perović scored on the Chicago Fire and Monarcas Morelia.

Perović concluded the 2010 season as the Revolution's top scorer, with 6 regular season goals (8 across all competitions), and an additional 3 assists. He was voted 2010 Team MVP on October 16.

In what would be his only full season with the Revolution, Perovic established himself as an instant success and a fan favorite. In 2010 he not only led the team in scoring (8 goals in all competitions) but also won the Team MVP. He is remembered for his dynamic attacking play and free kick specialty.

2011 Season, Injury, Contract Disputes
Perović's first goal of the 2011 season also proved to be his last for the club. Assisted by Benny Feilhaber (In Benny's league debut), in the 12th minute, he curled a 25-yard ball past Kansas City's on April 23, 2011. This goal snapped the Revolution's 192 minute scoreless streak.

Perović was subbed off in the 60th minute of the same game with a left knee injury. Though nothing serious was apparent at the time of the injury, it was later determined to have aggravated a previous condition. The injury resulted in major surgery "requiring surgeons to reconstruct his left ACL, repair a medial meniscus tear and perform a chondroplasty on his medial femoral condyle." This effectively ended Marko's season, as it was learned he would miss 6–9 months due to the gravity of the procedure

Almost a month after surgery, New England declined on their option to extend Perović contract on July 1, 2011.

The announcement led to controversy and some backlash from fans and Perović. The Revolution were in the midst of what would become their worst season in club history and had limited attacking options. Marko had two-and-a-half years left on his contract at the time of his injury, but The Revolution were insistent that Marko had specifically asked for his option to be dropped. In an interview with fan blog The Bent Musket, Perović denied this, stating:

"I only have to tell you that I had a contract with the club and the deal would not comply. Took advantage of what I had hurt and offered me conditions that were not in agreement, this is blackmail, because I do not have the right to negotiate as an injured player...

"Wanted more link to me for a year. All the players at the club know that I came here because my half of the money given to FC Basel and was now turn to New England to regulate."

Though the situation remains unclear, the blog speculates that Perović may have asked for his option to be dropped so that he could renegotiate his contract in hopes of a raise, coming off his stellar 2010 season, and this may have led to a misunderstanding with the club.

Perović's additional statements, such as "All players know what is happening at the club" he continued. "I know how all club functions. P[a]triots club is the only important." and "In any case [people] here are not thinking for the future," led fans to believe that the organization had in fact cut him without thought of renegotiating his deal. These statements were compounded by prior states from Revolution players like Jeff Larentowicz, who had stated "[In New England] we had a great practice field and locker room, but we were, rightfully so, second fiddle to [the Patriots]."

Despite the contentious words, Perović signed off  with a positive note, saying "The whole truth is that I love Boston, club and fans and I wanted to stay here [for my entire career]."

Though he'd return for a trial in January 2014 as an unsigned free agent, he would make no more appearances for the Revolution.

Red Star Belgrade
On 16 December 2011, he returned to Red Star Belgrade.

He signed a contract with Iranian side Persepolis on 20 December 2012 but he was released at the end of the season.

R&F
On 27 July 2017, it was reported that Perović had agreed to join Hong Kong Premier League club R&F. He had arrived in Hong Kong only seven months earlier and spent the past half season at South China.

Guangzhou R&F
In January 2018, Perović joined R&F's mother team Guangzhou R&F in the Chinese Super League.

International career
Perović was also a member of the Serbia U21. He broke his leg in May 2007 against Mladost Apatin during Red Star's second-last game of the season. This injury caused him to miss the 2007 UEFA European Under-21 Championship, in which Serbia eventually reached the final, losing to the Netherlands.

Honours

Club
Red Star Belgrade
 Serbian SuperLiga: 2003–04, 2005–06, 2006–07
 Serbian Cup: 2003–04, 2005–06, 2006–07, 2011–12
Basel
 Swiss Super League: 2007–08
 Swiss Cup: 2007–08
Persepolis
 Hazfi Cup runner-up: 2012–13

References

External links

 
 
 
 
 Profile and stats until 2003 in Dekisa.Tripod
 
 

1984 births
Living people
Serbian footballers
Sportspeople from Pristina
Kosovo Serbs
Association football wingers
Serbia under-21 international footballers
Serbia and Montenegro under-21 international footballers
Red Star Belgrade footballers
FK Jedinstvo Ub players
OFK Beograd players
FK Radnički 1923 players
First League of Serbia and Montenegro players
Serbian SuperLiga players
FC Basel players
Swiss Super League players
New England Revolution players
Major League Soccer players
Hong Kong Premier League players
Persepolis F.C. players
South China AA players
R&F (Hong Kong) players
Guangzhou City F.C. players
Serbian expatriate footballers
Expatriate footballers in Switzerland
Expatriate soccer players in the United States
Expatriate footballers in Iran
Expatriate footballers in Thailand
Expatriate footballers in Malaysia
Expatriate footballers in Brazil
Expatriate footballers in Hong Kong
Expatriate footballers in China
Guangzhou City F.C. non-playing staff